Stilpnogaster is a genus of flies belonging to the family Asilidae.

Species
Species within this genus include:
 Stilpnogaster aemula (Meigen, 1820)
 Stilpnogaster argonautica Janssens, 1955
 Stilpnogaster setiventris (Zetterstedt, 1860)	
 Stilpnogaster stabilis (Zeller, 1840)

References

Asilidae
Asilidae genera